Md Tanjil Alam (born 21 January) is a professional dancer and choreographer from Bangladesh. He earned the Bangladesh National Film Award for Best Choreography in 2009 for Amar Praner Priya.

Career
Tanjil's career as a dancer began in 1996, with multiple performances on stage, movies, and television. He formed the Eagles Dance Group with Sumon Rahman, Ifti Ahmed, and Oli Adnan in 1999. Since 2008, he actively works as a dance choreographer under the company banner. He has done choreography for music videos and films, such as Chumma (song), Lal Lipstick, and Amar Praner Priya.

Personal life
Tanjil is married to Sadia Islam Lamia since 13 June 2015.

Filmography
 Amar Praner Priya (2009)

Awards and nominations
Tanjil received the Bangladesh National Film Award for Best Choreography in 2009.

References

External links
 

Bangladeshi choreographers
Year of birth missing (living people)
Living people
People from Dhaka
Best Choreography National Film Award (Bangladesh) winners
Bangladeshi male dancers